Alandria is a genus of moths in the subfamily Arctiinae. It contains the single species Alandria coeruleipuncta, which is found in Bolivia.

References

Natural History Museum Lepidoptera generic names catalog

Arctiinae
Monotypic moth genera
Moths of South America